The 2006 European Mountain Running Championships were held in north-eastern Bohemia, Czech Republic, between 8 July and 9 July 2006. They were that year's area championships for mountain running, held by the European Athletic Association.

Teams arrived in Trutnov, at the Hotel Patria on 7 July and the competition officially began on 8 July in Malé Svatoňovice at the bottom of the Jestřebí Mountains (16 km from Trutnov, 5 km from Úpice).

Results

Men

Women

External links
Official website

European Mountain Running Championships
European Mountain Running Championships
European Mountain Running Championships
European Mountain Running Championships
International athletics competitions hosted by the Czech Republic